This is a following list for the MTV Movie Award winners for Best New Filmmaker. This award was last given out in 2002.

Winners

References

External links
 The MTV Movie Award for Best New Filmmaker article

MTV Movie & TV Awards
Awards established in 1992
Awards disestablished in 2002